Richgrove is a census-designated place (CDP) in Tulare County, California, United States. The population was 2,882 at the 2010 census, up from 2,723 at the 2000 census.

Geography
Richgrove is located at  (35.796677, -119.106654).

Demographics

2010
The 2010 United States Census reported that Richgrove had a population of 2,882. The racial makeup of Richgrove was 1,068 (37.1%) White, 20 (0.7%) African American, 38 (1.3%) Native American, 140 (4.9%) Asian, 7 (0.2%) Pacific Islander, 1,521 (52.8%) from other races, and 88 (3.1%) from two or more races. Hispanic or Latino of any race were 2,705 persons (93.9%).

The Census reported that 2,882 people (100% of the population) lived in households, 0 (0%) lived in non-institutionalized group quarters, and 0 (0%) were institutionalized.

There were 598 households, out of which 441 (73.7%) had children under the age of 18 living in them, 410 (68.6%) were opposite-sex married couples living together, 95 (15.9%) had a female householder with no husband present, 64 (10.7%) had a male householder with no wife present.  There were 54 (9.0%) unmarried opposite-sex partnerships, and 2 (0.3%) same-sex married couples or partnerships. 20 households (3.3%) were made up of individuals, and 12 (2.0%) had someone living alone who was 65 years of age or older. The average household size was 4.82.  There were 569 families (95.2% of all households); the average family size was 4.78.

The population was spread out, with 1,157 people (40.1%) under the age of 18, 387 people (13.4%) aged 18 to 24, 757 people (26.3%) aged 25 to 44, 451 people (15.6%) aged 45 to 64, and 130 people (4.5%) who were 65 years of age or older.  The median age was 22.9 years. For every 100 females, there were 111.8 males.  For every 100 females age 18 and over, there were 108.8 males.

The homeowner vacancy rate was 0%; the rental vacancy rate was 0.3%.  1,247 people (43.3% of the population) lived in owner-occupied housing units and 1,635 people (56.7%) lived in rental housing units.

2000
As of the census of 2000, there were 2,723 people, 561 households, and 521 families residing in the CDP. The racial makeup of the CDP was 16.12% White, 0.07% African American, 0.81% Native American, 6.06% Asian, 0.22% Pacific Islander, 74.48% from other races, and 2.24% from two or more races. Hispanic or Latino of any race were 91.55% of the population.

There were 561 households, out of which 69.3% had children under the age of 18 living with them, 71.3% were married couples living together, 14.4% had a female householder with no husband present, and 7.0% were non-families. 4.8% of all households were made up of individuals, and 1.8% had someone living alone who was 65 years of age or older.  The average household size was 4.85 and the average family size was 4.93.

In the CDP, the population was spread out, with 43.5% under the age of 18, 12.1% from 18 to 24, 26.9% from 25 to 44, 13.1% from 45 to 64, and 4.4% who were 65 years of age or older.  The median age was 21 years. For every 100 females, there were 112.1 males.  For every 100 females age 18 and over, there were 111.1 males.

The median income for a household in the CDP was $22,885, and the median income for a family was $23,109. Males had a median income of $20,089 versus $12,500 for females. The per capita income for the CDP was $6,415.  About 33.1% of families and 36.9% of the population were below the poverty line, including 46.2% of those under age 18 and 16.1% of those age 65 or over.

Politics
In the state legislature Richgrove is located in the 16th Senate District, represented by Democrat Dean Florez, and in the 30th Assembly District, represented by Republican Danny Gilmore.

In the United States House of Representatives, Richgrove is in

References

Census-designated places in Tulare County, California
Census-designated places in California